Davis Lake Provincial Park is a  park in British Columbia, Canada, established as a protected provincial park in October 1963. It is located east of the southern end of Stave Lake, northeast of Mission, British Columbia, approximately 18 km north on Sylvester Rd from BC Highway 7. There are campgrounds and beaches at the south end of the lake, access is walk-in only via a 1 km unmaintained gravel road.  

The park features bird habitat for sapsuckers, woodpeckers and spotted owls as well as a relatively untouched stand of old growth Western Hemlock.

Davis Lake Provincial Park attractions include:
 canoeing and kayaking, although there are no campsites accessible via kayak or canoe,
 fishing - requiring a fishing permit, 
 hiking - in particular to McDonald Falls,  on Murdo Creek, accessed downhill from the Lost Creek Forest Service Road (continuation of Sylvester Road) just east of the lake. 
 swimming 

A 2018 report by the Vancouver Sun indicated that the province had some way to go with urgent need for better park management, in particular in the case of Davis Lake Provincial Park.

See also
Cascade Falls Regional Park
Hatzic Valley

References

External links

Lower Mainland
Provincial parks of British Columbia
Douglas Ranges
1963 establishments in British Columbia
Protected areas established in 1963